Jonas Källström (born 23 September 1963) is a Swedish former footballer who played as a midfielder. He made 98 Allsvenskan appearances for IK Brage and scored six goals. For IK Brage, he also made two appearances in the 1988–89 UEFA Cup.

He is the brother of Swedish footballer Mikael Källström and the uncle of Swedish international footballer Kim Källström.

References

Living people
1963 births
Association football midfielders
Swedish footballers
Allsvenskan players
IK Brage players